Abd ar-Rahman ibn Uqba was the Wali, or governor, of Septimania, an Upper March (administrative division of the Emirate of Córdoba) that substituted Umar ibn Umar in 755. During his governing, Narbonne was lost by conquest to the Franks.

8th-century rulers in Europe
Upper March
8th-century people from al-Andalus

8th-century Arabs
People from the Emirate of Córdoba
Umayyad governors of Al-Andalus